Production drawings (sometimes called working drawings) are complete sets of drawings that detail the manufacturing and assembly of products (as distinct from engineering drawings prepared by and/or for product engineers whose task is to decide how best to manufacture the products).

Machine operators, production line workers and supervisors all use production drawings.

Design engineers also use orthographic or pictorial views called "working cases" to record their ideas. These preliminary sketches are used as the basis for both the component and assembly drawings. Production drawings are 'drawn' (graphic) information prepared by the design team for use by the construction or production team, the main purpose of which is to define the size, shape, location and production of the building or component'.

Orthographic projections are often supplied, giving views of machine parts and their assembly in an accessible form akin to artistic rendering in perspective, sometimes in exploded form which illustrates how the whole may be constructed from sub-assemblies and sub-assemblies into individual components. The production drawings may describe the preferred order in which to assemble components and if the engineering drawings call for a screw fastener to be tightened to a specific torque the production drawings would typically describe the tool to be used and how it should be calibrated.

Material and component specifics are commonly provided in the title block of a production drawing. Sub-assemblies (or the main assembly of components) are usually shown and the production drawings may specify where each assembled component will be built. Production drawings also record the number of parts that are required for making the assembled unit and may form an essential part of the documentation required to authorise the production of the item described.

Drawing set

Three main sets of production drawings include the following:
 Detail of each non-standard part on a drawing sheet, usually one part per sheet
 Assembly drawing showing all parts on one sheet
 A Bill of materials (BOM), essentially of each part

Elements of production drawings 
The basic elements of production drawings include:
 Size and shape of component
 Format of drawing sheet
 Process sheet
 Projection method
 Limits, fits, and tolerances of size, form, and position
 Production method
 Indication of surface roughness and other heat treatments
 Material specification and Shape such as Castings, Forgings, Plates, Rounds, etc.
 Conventions used to represent certain machine components
 Inspection and Testing Methods
 Specification of Standard Components

Basic principles of dimensioning in production drawings
The basic principles of dimensioning in production drawings include the following:
 The drawing module should dimension each feature only once.
 The drawing should show no more dimensions than necessary.
 Place dimensions outside the drawing view as far as possible.
 Represent dimensions by visible outlines rather than by hidden lines.
 Avoid dimensioning the center line, except when it passes through the center hole.
 Avoid intersecting projection or dimension lines.
 If the space for dimensioning is insufficient, you may reverse arrow heads and replace adjacent arrow heads with dots.

Dimensioning technique

Any engineering drawing requires specifications in terms of dimensions. Dimensions are classified as the following:
 Functional dimensions
 Non-functional dimensions
 Auxiliary dimensions
Non-functional dimensions are required for manufacturing.

Auxiliary dimensions do not govern manufacturing or inspection of parts. They are arranged in the following ways:
Chain dimensioning: This method can be used only where the accumulation of tolerances does not affect the functional requirements.
Parallel dimensioning: In this type of dimensioning, a number of single dimension lines are drawn parallel to one another, spaced so as to accommodate the dimensional values.
Running dimensioning: This type of dimensioning is similar to parallel dimensioning; the only difference is that the dimensions are superimposed in one line. In this case, the origin point should be marked.
Coordinate dimensioning: The location of each hole and its size is given by specifying X and Y coordinates from the defined origin and tabulating them.

Production drawing in limits, fits and tolerance

Limit system

There are three terms used in the limit system:
Tolerance: Deviation from a basic value is defined as Tolerance. It can be obtained by taking the difference between the maximum and minimum permissible limits.
Limits: Two extreme permissible sizes between which the actual size is contained are defined as limits.
Deviation: The algebraic difference between a size and its corresponding basic size. There are two types of deviations: 1) Upper deviation 2) Lower deviation
The fundamental deviation is either the upper or lower deviation, depending on which is closer to the basic size.

Tolerances
Due to human errors, machine settings, etc., it is nearly impossible to manufacture an absolute dimension as specified by the designer. Deviation in dimensions from the basic value always arises. This deviation of dimensions from the basic value is known as Tolerance.

The figure shows mechanical tolerances which occur during operations.

Fits
The relation between tightness and looseness between two mating parts is called fit. Depending upon the actual limits of the hole or shaft sizes, fits may be classified as clearance fit, transition fit and interference fit.

Clearance fit

Clearance fit is defined as a clearance between mating parts. In clearance fit, there is always a positive clearance between the hole and shaft.

Transition fit

Transition fit may result in either an interference or clearance, depending upon the actual values of the tolerance of individual parts.

Interference fit

Interference fit is obtained if the difference between the hole and shaft sizes is negative before assembly. Interference fit generally ranges from minimum to maximum interference. The two extreme cases of interference are as follows:

Minimum interference

The magnitude of the difference (negative) between the maximum size of the hole and the minimum size of the shaft in an interference fit before assembly.

Maximum interference

The magnitude of the difference between the minimum size of the hole and the maximum size of the shaft in an interference or a transition fit before assembly.

Hole Basis and shaft basis system: In identifying limit dimensions for the three classes of fit, two systems are in use: 
 Hole basis system: The size of the shaft is obtained by subtracting the allowance from the basic size of the hole. Tolerances are then applied to each part separately. In this system, the lower deviation of the hole is zero. The letter symbol indication for this is 'H'.
 Shaft basis system: The upper deviation of the shaft is zero, and the size of the hole is obtained by adding the allowance to the basic size of the shaft. The letter symbol indication is 'h'.

Production drawing in surface roughness
The properties and performance of machine components are affected by the degree of roughness of various surfaces; the higher the smoothness of the surface, the greater the fatigue strength and corrosion resistance will be. Friction between mating parts is also reduced by a smoother surface finish. The geometrical characteristics of the surface, in relation to roughness, are as follows:
Macro-deviations
Surface waviness
Micro irregularities

Surface roughness can be evaluated with the height and mean roughness index of micro-irregularities. Surface roughness is defined by the following terms:
Actual profile
Reference profile
Datum profile
Main profile
Mean roughness index
Surface roughness number, etc.
Surface roughness number: The surface roughness number [R(a)] represents the average departure of the surface from the projections over the sampling length, which is expressed in micrometers. It is given by R(a)={h1+h2+h3+.....+hn}/n. Surface roughness can be measured using some of the following terms:
Surface gauge
Straight edge
Profilograph
Profilometer
Optical flat, etc.

Production drawing and process sheets
Production drawing roughness skew is shown in the accompanying figure.

Process sheets

The production drawing of a component is usually accompanied by a sheet known as a process sheet, which indicates the sequence of operations recommended for manufacturing. It should list the machinery, tooling and skills for each act or event. The process sheet should consist of the following:
Description of the job
Component number
Size and weight
Cycle time
Drawing number
Sequence number, etc.

Uses of process sheets

Process sheets provide:
An overall view of the various operations that are to be performed for a job.
Assistance with layout of the plant during the product design.
Assistance in cost estimation, standard costs, production control and evaluation for productivity.
Information for methods study personnel, to optimize the production process.

Principles of production drawings
Production drawings are to be prepared on standard size drawing sheets and or prints. The correct size of sheet and size of object can be visualized not only from the views graphic views of  but also from the various types of lines used, dimensions, notes, scales, etc. which enable everyone concerned - so long as they are fully conversant with the conventions used - to have a clear and unambiguous understanding of tasks, products and process. The ISO 128 international standards describe drawing conventions is some detail, including views, lines, cuts and sections but these are not in universal use (in India these standards are set by the Bureau of Indian Standards).

Drawing sheets
In production drawing standard size sheets are generally used to save paper and facilitate convenient storage of drawings. In specifications of sheets their size, the size of the title block and its position, the thickness of borders and frames etc., must be considered.

Sheet size
The basic principles to be followed in the sizes of drawing sheets are:
 X:Y=1:1.414
 X:Y=1, where X and Y are the sheet width and length.
For the reference size (A0), with a surface area of 1 sq meter, X=841mm and Y=1189mm.

Title block
The title block, containing the identification of the drawing, should lie within the drawing space at the bottom right hand corner. The direction of viewing of the title block should correspond in general with that of the drawing. The block will contain various identifiers such as: Company name, part name, drawing number, material, treatment or finishing, etc.  Depending on the drawing standard, title blocks will vary.

See also
Technical drawing
Engineering drawing

References

External links
 Design Handbook: Engineering Drawing and Sketching, by MIT OpenCourseWare
 Manufacturing and Mechanical Drawing

Product design